Gregory Clement (1594–1660) was an English Member of Parliament (MP) and one of the regicides of King Charles I.

Biography
Clement was baptised at St Andrew's, Plymouth on 21 November 1594. His father, John Clement, was a merchant and mayor of Plymouth and his mother was Judith Sparke. After working in India for the British East India Company, Clement returned to London and married Christian Barter at St Dunstan's and All Saints Church in Stepney on 25 June 1630. When the Civil War broke out, he supported Parliament.

In 1648, he became an MP for Fowey in Cornwall. In January 1649, as a commissioner of the High Court of Justice at the trial of King Charles, he was 54th of the 59 signatories on the death warrant of the king—although his signature appears to have been written over an erased signature. 

He was dismissed from the House of Commons in 1652 over a scandal involving his maidservant. This may have been engineered by Thomas Harrison and other political opponents.

Like all of the other 59 men who signed the death warrant for Charles I, Clement was in grave danger when Charles II of England was restored to the throne. Some of the 59 fled England but Clement went into hiding. He was discovered and, after his identity was confirmed by a blind man who recognised his voice, he was arrested and put on trial. Although he initially pleaded innocent and remained silent while imprisoned, he eventually changed his plea and was found guilty of high treason. He was hanged, drawn and quartered at Charing Cross on 17 October 1660.

According to Mark Twain's autobiography, an irate Virginian correspondent called Twain a descendant of a regicide (apparently referring to Gregory Clement) and berated him for supporting the—as he called it—aristocratic Republican Party.

References

See also 
Regicide
List of regicides of Charles I

1594 births
1660 deaths
British East India Company people
Members of the pre-1707 English Parliament for constituencies in Cornwall
Executed regicides of Charles I
People executed by Stuart England by hanging, drawing and quartering
Executed English people
People executed under the Stuarts for treason against England
English MPs 1648–1653
English politicians convicted of crimes